Konomi Taniguchi (born 23 August 1996) is a Japanese professional footballer who plays as a forward for WE League club Sanfrecce Hiroshima Regina.

Club career 
Taniguchi made her WE League debut on 12 September 2021.

References 

Living people
1996 births
Japanese women's footballers
Women's association football forwards
Sanfrecce Hiroshima Regina players
WE League players
Association football people from Kyoto Prefecture